Neil McArthur may refer to:

 Neil McArthur (footballer) (1898–1974), New Zealand football player
 Neil McArthur (businessman) (born 1956/57), British businessman